KLDX (88.5 FM) is a radio station in Sioux Center, Iowa, owned by Educational Media Foundation and airing the K-Love network. It was originally established by Dordt University (then Dordt College) and was operated by the school from 1968 to 2021.

History
KDCR signed on August 16, 1968, at 91.3 MHz; it broadcast with 48,000 watts. It moved to 88.5 MHz in 1981 in order to increase power to 100,000 watts. KDCR followed closely the Christian Reformed Church in North America tradition that gave rise and shape to Dordt University.

Sale to EMF
On March 22, 2021, Dordt University announced that, due to declining listener support and ongoing costs, it would sell KDCR to the Educational Media Foundation, which would begin programming K-Love on May 15; Dordt sporting events would continue to stream online. The call letters were changed to KLDX on May 15, 2021, coinciding with the beginning of the operating agreement. The sale, at a price of $200,000, was consummated on July 1, 2021.

References

External links

LDX
Radio stations established in 1968
1968 establishments in Iowa
Educational Media Foundation radio stations
K-Love radio stations